Numerous video games were released in 2012. Many awards went to games such as Borderlands 2, Far Cry 3, Journey, Mass Effect 3, Dishonored, The Walking Dead and XCOM: Enemy Unknown. The year began with the worldwide release of Sony's handheld game console, the PlayStation Vita, originally launched in Japan in December 2011. The end of the year marked the worldwide release of Nintendo's home game console, the Wii U.

Critically acclaimed titles
Metacritic (MC) and GameRankings (GR) are aggregators of video game journalism reviews.

Highest-grossing games
The following were 2012's top ten highest-grossing video games in terms of worldwide revenue (including physical sales, digital purchases, subscriptions, microtransactions, free-to-play and pay-to-play) across all platforms (including mobile, PC and console platforms).

Events

Hardware releases
The list of game consoles released in 2012 in North America.

Series with new entries
Series with new installments in 2012 include Alan Wake, Assassin's Creed, Borderlands, Call of Duty, Counter-Strike, Darksiders, Dead or Alive, Diablo, Fable, Far Cry, Forza Motorsport, Guild Wars, Halo, Hitman, Mario Party, Marvel vs. Capcom, Mass Effect, Max Payne, Medal of Honor, Modern Combat, Need for Speed, Ninja Gaiden, PlanetSide, Pokémon, Prototype, Resident Evil, Silent Hill, Sniper Elite, Spec Ops, Super Mario, Tekken, The Darkness, Tom Clancy's Ghost Recon, Transformers, Trials, X-COM and Yakuza.

In addition, 2012 saw the introduction of several new properties, including Asura's Wrath, Dishonored, Journey, Lollipop Chainsaw, Sleeping Dogs and Forza Horizon.

Game releases
The list of games released in 2012 in North America.

January–March

April–June

July–September

October–December

Video game-based film and television releases

See also
2012 in games

References

 
Video games by year